The 3rd constituency of Nord is a French legislative constituency in the Nord département.

Description

Nord's 3rd constituency covers the south eastern corner of the department around the town of Maubeuge. The seat is wedged between Belgium to the north and Picardie to the south.

Following the 2010 redistricting the seat is now in a completely different place compared to his previous incarnation. The previous 3rd constituency covered the city of Lille. Any historical therefore needs to be made with the now defunct 23rd and 24th constituencies one of which was held by the UMP and one by the Socialist Party prior to 2012. The defeated UMP candidate at the 2012 election Christine Marin had previously represented Nord's 23rd constituency.

Historic Representation

Election results

2022

 
 
 
 
 
 
 
 
|-
| colspan="8" bgcolor="#E9E9E9"|
|-

2017

2012

 
 
 
 
 
|-
| colspan="8" bgcolor="#E9E9E9"|
|-

2007

 
 
 
 
 
 
 
|-
| colspan="8" bgcolor="#E9E9E9"|
|-

2002

 
 
 
 
 
 
|-
| colspan="8" bgcolor="#E9E9E9"|
|-

1997

 
 
 
 
 
 
 
|-
| colspan="8" bgcolor="#E9E9E9"|
|-

Sources
Official results of French elections from 2002: "Résultats électoraux officiels en France" (in French).

3